Sir John Stonhouse, 2nd Baronet of Radley  may refer to

Sir John Stonhouse, 2nd Baronet (creation of 1628) (1601 – 14 June 1632, an English politician who sat in the House of Commons from 1628 to 1629.
Sir John Stonhouse, 2nd Baronet (creation of 1670) (1639–1700), an English politician who sat in the House of Commons at various times between 1675 and 1690.